Rhodeus amurensis is a temperate freshwater fish belonging to the Acheilognathinae subfamily of the family Cyprinidae.  It originates in the Amur River and Lake Khanka in Asia, and is found in China and Russia. It was originally described as Pseudoperilampus lighti amurensis by B.B. Vronsky in 1967, and has also been referred to in scientific literature as Rhodeus lighti amurensis.

The females deposit their eggs inside bivalves, where they hatch and the young remain until they can swim.

References 

amurensis
Fish described in 1967